Estádio Mutange, also known as Estádio Gustavo Paiva, is a multi-use stadium located in Maceió, Brazil. It is used mostly for football matches and hosts the home matches of Centro Sportivo Alagoano and Associação Atlética Ponte Preta (AL), and hosted the home matches of Esporte Clube Barroso. The stadium has a maximum capacity of 4,000 people and was built in 1922.

References

External links
Templos do Futebol

Mutange
Maceió
Sports venues in Alagoas